Bruce DeMars is a retired United States Navy four star admiral who served as Director, Naval Nuclear Propulsion from 1988 to 1996.

Early years
DeMars was born in Chicago, Illinois, on June 3, 1935, and graduated from the United States Naval Academy in 1957.

Naval service
After graduation, he initially served aboard the surface ships  and  before attending Submarine School.

Submarine service
His first submarine assignment was the diesel .

His shore duty stations include being an instructor at the Nuclear Power School and Submarine School and attending the Armed Forces Staff College. After staff duty with Squadron Ten, DeMars served as Senior Member of the Nuclear Propulsion Examining Board, United States Atlantic Fleet.

He commanded Submarine Development Squadron Twelve in New London, Connecticut and then served as Deputy Director, Attack Submarine Division in the Office of the Chief of Naval Operations, until selected for promotion to Rear Admiral in 1981.

Admiral DeMars was the “Father” and Leader for the Cold War and Post Cold War battle for submarine supremacy of the United States Navy. With clear and documented intelligence information, mostly as a result of the Walker Whitworth espionage cases, the USSR NUCLEAR Submarine Operational and Stealth Technology had achieved major advances compared to the historical superiority of the United States Submarine Force which was well documented by the U.S. Intelligence Community and Operational Experience. As a result, and as a major initiative Admiral DeMars took the leadership role and Challenged the United States Submarine Leadership, the Submarine Technology Centers and the Submarine Military Industrial Complex to take immediate and effective action to restore the American Worldwide Submarine Stealth and Operational Superiority.

Within a short period of less than four years the Submarine Acquisition Programs had established a fully integrated series of design and technology advances and improvements as evidenced by the advanced SSN 688I Class, the SEAWOLF SUBMARINES: SSN 21, SSN 22, and SSN 23, the ARCI fully integrated forward fit and backfit program for all U.S. Submarines coupled with  the Virginia Class Design, Development and Delivery of a series of Submarines with major stealth and sensor advances far exceeding any technology of submarines in the World. Admiral DeMar's consistent, persistent and demanding approach was the primary incentive and the incentivised series of detailed plans and designs to achieve this success.

Flag assignments
His flag assignments include Commander, U.S. Naval Forces Marianas/Commander, U.S. Naval Base, Guam; Commander in Chief, Pacific Representative for Guam and the Trust Territory of the Pacific Islands; and Deputy Assistant Chief and then Deputy Chief of Naval Operations for Submarine Warfare.

He was confirmed by the United States Senate on September 30, 1988 for promotion to full admiral and on October 22, 1988, he relieved Admiral Kinnaird R. McKee as Director, Naval Nuclear Propulsion.

Retirement
DeMars retired on October 1, 1996.

Honors and awards
DeMars' decorations include:
the U.S. Naval Academy Alumni Association Distinguished Graduate Award
  Navy Distinguished Service Medal
  Legion of Merit with three award stars
  Meritorious Service Medal with award star
  Navy and Marine Corps Commendation Medal
  Navy and Marine Corps Achievement Medal
  Navy Unit Commendation.

In 2011, ADM DeMars received the Ellis Island Medal of Honor for his distinguished service to his country.

References

External links

1935 births
Living people
Farragut Career Academy alumni
United States Navy admirals
United States Naval Academy alumni
Recipients of the Navy Distinguished Service Medal
Recipients of the Legion of Merit
Military personnel from Chicago